Haniya Aslam is a Pakistani musician. She began her career as member of music group Zeb and Haniya along with her cousin Zebunnisa Bangash in 2007. In 2014 she left the group and moved to Canada for studies. Later she pursued her solo career in Canada.

Filmography

Television

Discography

Albums

References

External links

Living people
Pashtun women
Musicians from Toronto
Pakistani musicians
Musicians from Khyber Pakhtunkhwa
Year of birth missing (living people)